Eriophyllum staechadifolium is a flowering plant in the family Asteraceae which is known by the common name seaside woolly sunflower. It is native to the coastline of Oregon and California including the Channel Islands. This is a plant of the beaches, dunes, and coastal scrub.

Eriophyllum staechadifolium is variable in size, its height depending in part on its exposure to harsh coastal wind and saline spray. It may reach anywhere from 30 centimeters to 150 centimeters (1–5 feet) tall, and may be small and clumpy or quite sprawling. The leaves are up to seven centimeters (2.8 inches) long and are sometimes lobed. Each inflorescence holds several tightly packed flower heads in shades of golden yellow with centers full of 30-40 disc florets and usually a fringe of 6-6 small ray florets each a few millimeters long.

References

External links
Jepson Manual Treatment
United States Department of Agriculture Plants Profile
Calphotos Photo gallery, University of California

staechadifolium
Flora of California
Flora of Oregon
Natural history of the California chaparral and woodlands
Natural history of the Channel Islands of California
Plants described in 1816
Flora without expected TNC conservation status